Chakib Benzoukane (born 7 August 1986 in Marrakech) is a Moroccan footballer who plays as a defender.

Career
He started his career in Kawkab Marrakech.

Levski Sofia
In the summer of 2007 Benzoukane signed a four-year contract with Levski Sofia in the A PFG. The transfer fee was 500 000 euros. Benzoukane had many injuries during his playing days for Levski. That became the reason he missed the first part of 2008/2009 season. On 8 April 2009, he returned to the squad. He became a Champion of Bulgaria in 2009.

On 17 May 2010, Benzoukane renewed his contract until 30 June 2012. In January 2011 his contract was mutually terminated.

International
In 2005, he got to the semi-finals in the FIFA U-20 World Cup with Morocco U20.

In September 2009, he received his first call-up to the senior team of his country. On 10 October 2009, Benzoukane made his debut for Morocco, playing the full 90 minutes and earning himself a booking in the 1:3 away loss to Gabon in a 2010 FIFA World Cup qualification match.
On 10 August 2010, he was once again called up to the national team of Morocco for the debut of the new manager Eric Gerets.

Honours
  A PFG: 2008-09
  Bulgarian Supercup: 2007, 2009

References

External links
 
 Profile at Levskisofia.info 

Living people
1986 births
Moroccan footballers
Moroccan expatriate footballers
Morocco international footballers
Morocco under-20 international footballers
Kawkab Marrakech players
Apollon Limassol FC players
PFC Levski Sofia players
Hatta Club players
UAE First Division League players
First Professional Football League (Bulgaria) players
Expatriate footballers in Bulgaria
Expatriate footballers in Cyprus
Moroccan expatriate sportspeople in Bulgaria
Association football defenders
Sportspeople from Marrakesh
Moroccan expatriate sportspeople in Cyprus